The Journal of the Welsh Bibliographical Society was published annually from 1910 to 1984. It contained scholarly articles on Welsh writers, bibliographic research, and society notes in English and Welsh. It was published by the Welsh Bibliographical Society, which was founded in 1907 to promote the study of Welsh bibliography, publishing, printing and writing.

The journal has been digitized by the Welsh Journals Online project at the National Library of Wales.

External links
Journal of the Welsh Bibliographical Society at Welsh Journals Online

Magazines published in Wales
Welsh history journals
Publications established in 1907
Multilingual journals
Publications disestablished in 1984